Marcel César Poëte (10 October 1866 – 14 April 1950) was a French librarian, historian and urban planning theoretician. 
He was a co-founder of the School of Advanced Urban Studies, where he taught, and was highly influential in developing new theories of urban planning in Paris in the first half of the 20th century.

Life

Marcel César Poëte was born in Rougemont, Doubs, on 10 October 1866.
He studied at the École Nationale des Chartes (class of 1890) and then started work in the Bourges library.
He moved to Paris where he worked in the Sainte-Geneviève Library.
He then became curator of the municipal library of Besançon.
In 1903 he was head of the Historical Library of the City of Paris (Bibliothèque historique de la ville de Paris).
To make the library more accessible to the general public he arranged exhibitions and conferences, and lectured on the history of Paris.

In 1912 Louis Bonnier and Poëte made the first plan for expansion of Paris.
In 1916 Poëte decided to convert the library into the Institute of History, Geography and Urban Economy of the city of Paris (Institut d’histoire, de géographie et d’économie urbaine de la Ville de Paris). 
With help from this Institute and the Seine department Poëte, Bonnier and Henri Sellier co-founded the School of Advanced Urban Studies (École des hautes études urbaines, EHEU).
The EHEU was launched in 1918.
Poëte  and Bonnier launched the review La Vie Urbaine in 1919.

Poëte held the chair of the History Seminar at the École pratique des hautes études and was secretary of the Old Paris Committee.
He became a member of the Musée social and joined its section on rural and urban hygiene.
He was also involved in the Institute of Urbanism, the French Association of Town Planners (Société française des urbanistes), the Municipal Technicians and Hygienists Association (Association générale des hygiénistes et techniciens municipaux ) and the French Union of Local Authorities (Union des villes et communes de France).
In 1937 Sellier and Poëte founded the Fédération internationale de l’habitation et de l’urbanisme (International Federation of Housing and Urban Planning).
Marcel Poëte died in Paris on 14 April 1950.

Theories

As a historian Poëte had little interest in the chronicles of the aristocracy, but wanted to study the growth and evolution of the city as a biologist would observe an organism growing. 
He prized the documents in the Historical Library as central to understanding the past of the city.
He saw great value in photography, which began to be developed in the 1830s, as an objective record of the changing city.
In the 1910s and 1920s Poëte developed a new discipline which he called science de la ville and Patrick Geddes called "civics."
Poëte's writings about Paris and his courses at the EHEU reflect the profound influence of Henri Bergson.
He adopted Bergson's vitalism and his ideas of duration and "creative evolution" in architecture and city plans as opposed to mundane functionalism.

Poëte anticipated a new phase of industrial development in Paris.
He viewed a city as an living organism that constantly adapts itself to changes in the economic environment, while retaining relics of the past. 
He wanted to use the older structures as the basis for a city that was adapted to social needs and that could more easily adjust to industrialization.
His writings are full of biological metaphors.
He calls the city "a collective human being", a "living organism", with a "natural zoning" based on "the organic needs of a constantly evolving agglomeration."

Publications

Notes

Sources

Further reading

1866 births
1950 deaths
20th-century French historians
Librarians from Paris
École Nationale des Chartes alumni